Hrdza is a Slovak folk rock band from Prešov, formed in 1999.

The band mostly performs in their native Slovakia, but they have played in numerous other nations including Austria, the Czech Republic, Germany, Hungary, Poland, and Slovenia.

History 
Hrdza was formed in 1999 in Prešov by Slavomír Gibarti and Jaroslava Sisáková. It was later joined by Tóno Potočňák, Lukáš Maťufka and Róbert "Skippy" Hatala. In 2002, they came out with their self-published debut album "Muzička". In the autumn of 2002, founding member Sisáková left the band and was replaced by Veronika Rabadová. During that period, they won more than 20 awards at home, as well as in the Czech Republic. "Pod Božími Oknami" was their second album, released in 2006. In the summer of that year, their single "Na horách býva" was on the top 50 music chart in Slovakia for 17 weeks, reaching a peak position of 17. "Hajnajnanyja" was their third album, released in November 2009. Veronika Rabadová left in 2015 and Susanna Jara took the position of lead singer. Their most acclaimed album, "Neskrotený", was released in December 2018. It entered the World Music Charts Europe (WMCE) at number 4 in April 2019. This is the top position a Slovak band has ever reached. The song and video Stephen topped the World Music Charts by Ethnocloud in March 2019.

On the 15th of July, 2021, the group released its latest album, named 22.

Eurovision 2010 
In 2010, Hrdza participated in the Slovak National Round of Eurosong in the Eurovision Song Contest 2010 with the song "Taká sa mi páči". The group won 19.5% of the vote, but was disqualified from the contest when it was realized that Hrdza had presented the song before 1 October 2009, which was in violation of the rules.

Members 
Current Members

 Slavomír Gibarti - Vocals and Guitar
 Susanna Jara - Vocals and Violin
 Dominik Maniak - Vocals and Violin
 Matej Palidrab - Vocals and Accordion
 Pavol Boleš - Vocals, Accordion and Bass Guitar
 Marek Szarvaš - Drums

Alternative Members

 Lucia Gibarti - Vocals
 Julka Smolková - Vocals
 Ľubo Šamo - Vocals and Violin
 Mykhaylo Zakhariya - Cimbalom

Past Members

 Veronika Šoltysová-Rabadová - Vocals (2002 - 2015)
 Jaroslava Sisáková - Vocals (1999 - 2002)
 Anton Potočňák - Vocals and Violin
 Michal Brandys - Vocals and Violin (2006 - unclear)
 Michal Lörinc - Drums and Various Percussion
 Lukáš Maťufka - Drums and Various Percussion (2000 - unclear)
 Róbert "Skippy" Hatala - Vocals and Bass Guitar (2002 - 2004)
 Miroslav Szirmai - Drums and Various Percussion (ca. 2009 - unclear)
 Marián Šurányi - Vocals and Accordions (2012 - unclear)

Discography

References 

Slovak rock music groups
1999 establishments in Slovakia